Zulhelmi Md Pisol (born 22 August 1993) is a Malaysian weightlifter. He won the silver medal in the men's 56 kg event at the 2014 Commonwealth Games.

External links
 

1993 births
Living people
People from Penang
Malaysian people of Malay descent
Malaysian Muslims
Sportspeople from Penang
Malaysian male weightlifters
Commonwealth Games silver medallists for Malaysia
Weightlifters at the 2014 Commonwealth Games
Weightlifters at the 2014 Asian Games
Commonwealth Games medallists in weightlifting
Asian Games competitors for Malaysia
21st-century Malaysian people
Medallists at the 2014 Commonwealth Games